USS Tarrant (AK-214) was an  that was constructed for the US Navy during the closing period of World War II. She was commissioned; however, the war ended and she was returned to the War Shipping Administration in November 1945 for disposal.

Construction 
Tarrant was laid down under US Maritime Commission (MARCOM) contract, MC hull 2168, on 4 December 1944, by the Leathem D. Smith Shipbuilding Company, Sturgeon Bay, Wisconsin; launched on 25 February 1945; sponsored by Miss Agnes Larson; and commissioned on 18 September 1945.

World War II-related service 
Tarrant and her U.S. Coast Guard crew reported to the Commander in Chief, Atlantic Fleet, on 24 September as available for her shakedown cruise. However, since World War II had ended, she was ordered to report to the Commandant, 8th Naval District for disposal.

Service history 
Tarrant and her Coast Guard crew reported to the Commander in Chief, US Atlantic Fleet, on 24 September as available for her shakedown cruise. However, since World War II had ended, she was ordered to report to the Commandant, 8th Naval District for disposal.

Tarrant reported on 30 September and was decommissioned and returned to the War Shipping Administration (WSA) on 21 November. Tarrant was struck from the Navy list on 6 December 1945.

Merchant service
She was sold to Brazieiro Patrisonio Nacional, 15 March 1947. She was later scrapped in 1969.

Notes 

Citations

Bibliography 

Online resources

External links

 

Alamosa-class cargo ships
Ships built in Sturgeon Bay, Wisconsin
1945 ships
World War II auxiliary ships of the United States
Tarrant County, Texas